Niobium diselenide or niobium(IV) selenide is a layered transition metal dichalcogenide with formula NbSe2. Niobium diselenide is a lubricant, and a superconductor at temperatures below 7.2 K that exhibit a charge density wave (CDW). NbSe2 crystallizes in several related forms, and can be mechanically exfoliated into monatomic layers, similar to other transition metal dichalcogenide monolayers. Monolayer NbSe2 exhibits very different properties from the bulk material, such as of Ising superconductivity, quantum metallic state, and strong enhancement of the CDW.

Synthesis

Niobium diselenide crystals and thin films can be grown by chemical vapor deposition (CVD). Niobium oxide, selenium and NaCl powders are heated to different temperatures in the range 300–800 °C at ambient pressure in a furnace that allows maintaining a temperature gradient along its axis. Powders are placed in different locations in the furnace, and a mixture of argon and hydrogen is used as the carrier gas. The NbSe2 thickness can be accurately controlled by varying the temperature of selenium powder.

NbSe2 monolayers can also be exfoliated from the bulk or deposited by molecular beam epitaxy.

Structure
Niobium diselenide exists in several forms, including 1H, 2H, 4H and 3R, where H stands for hexagonal and R for rhombohedral, and the number 1, 2, etc., refers to the number of Se-Nb-Se layers in a unit cell. The Se-Nb-Se layers are bonded together with relatively weak van der Waals forces, and can be exfoliated into 1H monolayers. They  can be offset in a variety of ways to make different crystal structures, the most stable being 2H.

Properties

Superconductor
NbSe2 is a superconductor with a critical temperature TC = 7.2 K. The critical temperature drops when the NbSe2 layers are intercalated by other atoms, or when the sample thickness decreases, with TC being ~1 K in a  monolayer. Recent studies show infrared photodetection in NbSe2 devices.

Charge density wave
Along with the CDW the lattice develops a periodic lattice distortion around 26 K. This period is three times that of the crystal lattice, so that there is a 3 by 3 superlattice.

Friction
NbSe2 sheets develop higher friction when very thin.

Intercalation
Because the layers in NbSe2 are only weakly bonded together, different substances can penetrate between the layers to form well defined intercalation compounds. Compounds with helium, rubidium, transition metals, and post-transition metals have been made. Extra niobium atoms, up to one third extra can be added between the layers.

Extra metal atoms from first transition metal series can intercalate up to 1:3 ratio. they go in between the layers.

Intercalating two atoms of helium per formula increases the layer separation to 2.9 and the Se-Se distance to 3.52.

Rubidium
When rubidium is intercalated, the NbSe2 layers separate to accommodate it. Each individual layer is also compressed slightly. The Nb-Se distance stays the same, but the Nb-Nb distance in the layer increases. The Se-Se distance on top and bottom of the layer decreases, and the Nb-Se-Nb angle increases. Extra electron density transfers from the Rb atoms to the niobium layer.

Vanadium
Vanadium can enter the 2H NbSe2 structure to the limit of 1% by substituting for Nb. Between 11% and 20% it forms a 4Hb structure with V in octahedral coordination between layers. Over 30% it forms a 1T structure.

Fermi energy is shifted into the d band.

Iron
When doped with iron at levels greater than 8% NbSe2 can undergo a spin-glass transition at low temperatures.

Hydrogen
Hydrogen can be intercalated into NbSe2 under high pressure and high temperature. Up to 0.9 atoms of hydrogen per formula can be included while retaining the same structure. Over this ratio the structure changes to that of MoS2. At this transition the crystallographic c-axis increases and paramagnetic susceptibility drops to zero.
Hydrogen content can go to 5.2 molar ratio at 50.5 atmospheres.

Magnesium
When magnesium is intercalated, the electron s-states do not overlap with the selenium, and it only has a small effect in reducing the superconducting critical temperature.

Potential applications

Bemol Incorporated manufactured niobium diselenide in the United States for use as a conducting lubricant in vacuum, as it has a wide temperature stability range, very low outgassing, and lower resistance than graphite. NbSe2 was used as motor brushes, or embedded in silver to make a self lubricating surface.

References

Niobium(IV) compounds
Selenides
Monolayers
Transition metal dichalcogenides